Tianhe Coach Terminal Station is a terminus on Line 3 of the Guangzhou Metro, as well as a station on Guangzhou Metro's Line 6. It started operations on 30December 2006. It is located under the junction of Tianyuan Road and the Guangzhou North Ring Expressway in the Tianhe District. It is also located at the East Square of the Tianhe Coach Terminal, which has services to other locations in Guangdong and other provinces.

Station layout

Exits

References

External links

Railway stations in China opened in 2006
Guangzhou Metro stations in Tianhe District